The 1989 Grand Prix motorcycle racing season was the 41st F.I.M. Road Racing World Championship season.

Season summary
Defending champion Eddie Lawson stunned most observers by switching from the Yamaha to Honda in the offseason then proceeded to win the championship, becoming the first man to win two consecutive 500cc championships on two different brands. On why he left Yamaha for Honda: "Giacomo Agostini, the Marlboro Yamaha team manager, started playing games, saying stuff like, 'I don't know if we can pay you the same as we did in 1988.' I'd just won my third title, so that was tough to hear. Also, I found out Ago was talking to Kevin Schwantz. I met with Erv and told him that I needed a change. When Marlboro discovered I was talking with Honda, they doubled their offer, but it was too late. I actually took a pay cut to ride the Honda."

Wayne Rainey and Kevin Schwantz continued to perform impressively while Freddie Spencer made a less than successful comeback attempt with the Marlboro Yamaha team. Australian Wayne Gardner was out for most of the season after breaking his leg at Laguna Seca but not before winning the inaugural Grand Prix in his home country. Another Australian made his Grand Prix debut for the Rothmans Honda team with Mick Doohan scoring a third-place finish at the Hockenheimring. The FIM awarded half points for the rain-drenched Belgian Grand Prix after organisers restarted the race three times contrary to FIM race regulations. The Nations Grand Prix at Misano was boycotted by most of the top riders for safety reasons.

Sito Pons won a second consecutive 250 championship for Honda while Spanish teenager, Àlex Crivillé won the 125 crown on a Rotax-powered JJ Cobas motorcycle designed by Antonio Cobas. Derbi rider Manuel Herreros had the honor of winning the final 80cc world championship as the class would be discontinued after 1989.

1989 Grand Prix season calendar
The following Grands Prix were scheduled to take place in 1989:

Calendar changes
 The Australian Grand Prix was added to the calendar.
 The Expo 92 Grand Prix was taken off the calendar, as well as the Jarama circuit.
 The Nations Grand Prix moved from the Imola circuit to the Circuito Internazionale Santa Monica.
 The German Grand Prix moved from the Nürburgring to the Hockenheimring.
 The French Grand Prix moved from the Paul Ricard circuit to the Bugatti Circuit in Le Mans.

Participants

500cc participants

250cc participants

Results and standings

Grands Prix

500cc riders' standings
Scoring system
Points are awarded to the top fifteen finishers. A rider has to finish the race to earn points.